The Archdeacon of Lichfield (called Archdeacon of Stafford until 1980) is a senior cleric in the Diocese of Lichfield who is responsible for pastoral care and discipline of clergy in the Lichfield archdeaconry.

The archdeaconry was erected – as the Archdeaconry of Stafford – in the ancient Diocese of Coventry (later called Coventry and Lichfield, Lichfield and Coventry & Lichfield) before 1135, around the time when archdeacons were first being appointed across England. On 24 July 1877, the archdeaconry of Stoke-upon-Trent was created from the northern part of the Stafford archdeaconry. After the deanery of Stafford was transferred on 26 September 1979 to the Stoke archdeaconry, Stafford archdeaconry was renamed the archdeaconry of Lichfield on 25 April 1980. The archdeaconry is vacant.

List of archdeacons

High Medieval
At its creation, the archdeaconry was in the Diocese of Coventry.
 1135–1145: Robert
 bef. –aft. : William
 bef. –aft. : Helias
 bef. 1175–aft. 1175: Ralph de Thamewood
 1175–1182: Alan
 bef. 1191–aft. 1191: Henry Marshal (disputed)
 bef. 1191–aft. 1191: Alexander
 bef. 1194–1213 (res.): Henry de Loundres
 bef. –aft. : Helyas
 5 March 1213 – 1222 (d.): Robert of Gloucester (also Archdeacon of Sudbury from bef. 1220)
From 1228, the diocese became the Diocese of Coventry and Lichfield.
 bef. 1238–aft. 1224: William of York
 bef. 1234–aft. 1234: R. de Langdon
 bef. 1244–aft. 1244: Robert of Stafford
 bef. 1259–aft. 1259: Richard de Mepham
 bef. 1265–1275 (res.): Thomas de Cantilupe
 bef. –aft. : Adam Paine
 ?–bef. 1301 (d.): Rayner de Vichio/Florence

Late Medieval
 6 June 1301 – 19 January 1322 (res.): John de Brunforte, son of Octavian
 8 December 1321 – 20 August 1323 (exch.): Robert de Patrika
 20 August 1323–June 1336 (d.): John Clarel
 ?–bef. 1349 (d.): William de Apeltre
 26 June 1349–bef. 1349 (d.): Roger de Depyng
 27 August 1349 – 4 June 1353 (exch.): Richard de Birmingham
 1349–bef. 1355 (d.): Roger de Dorkyng (unsuccessful claimant)
 4 June 1353 – 14 May 1356 (exch.): John de Marisco
 14 May 1356–bef. 1358 (d.): William de Grenburgh
 16 October 1358–bef. 1374 (d.): John de Sulgrave
 29 March 1374 – 1381 (res.): John de Outheby
 28 December 1381–bef. 1400 (res.): Richard de Toppeclyve
 1 September 1400–aft. 1413: Henry Davyd
 bef. 1415–aft. 1415: John Fyton
 bef. 1418–1418 (res.): Thomas Barton
 13 July 1418–bef. 1422 (res.): John Fyton (again)
 1 March 1422–bef. 1432 (d.): William de Admondeston
 4 July 1432–bef. 1442 (d.): Ralph Prestbury
 bef. 1442–bef. June 1442 (res.): Roger Wall
 29 June 1442 – 1459 (res.): John Wendesley, illegitimate son of Sir Thomas Wensley (d.1403) (or Wendesley) of Wensley in Derbyshire, five times a Member of Parliament for Derbyshire.
 27 May 1459–bef. 1467 (res.): Thomas Hawkins (became Archdeacon of Worcester)
 6 December 1467–March 1497 (d.): William Moggys
 30 March 1497–aft. 1497: William Duffield
 bef. 1501–30 June 1501 (res.): Edward Willughby

 30 June 1501–July 1515 (d.): John Wardroper
 20 July 1515–bef. 1529: Adam Grafton (died 23 June 1529)
 bef. 1530–1530 (res.): Geoffrey Blythe (nephew of Bishop Blythe)
 3 October 1530–aft. 1530: John Blythe (another Blythe nephew)
 bef. 1536–1540 (res.): Nicholas Heath
From 1539, the diocese became the Diocese of Lichfield and Coventry.
 13 November 1540–bef. 1547 (exch.): John Redman (Master of Trinity from 1546)

Early modern
 bef. 1547–?: John Dakyn (unsuccessful exchange)
 5 August 1547–September 1567 (d.): Richard Walker
 12 May 1567 – 1586 (res.): Thomas Bickley
 2 February 1586 – 12 October 1614 (d.): Humphrey Tyndall
 1613–bef. 1636 (d.): John Fulnetby
 27 December 1636–bef. 1660 (d.): Martin Tinley
 6 December 1660 – 4 May 1682 (d.): Francis Coke
 14 July 1682 – 4 May 1721 (d.): Nathaniel Ellison
 3 May 1721–bef. 1732 (d.): Thomas Allen (also Dean of Chester from 1722)
 30 June 1732–bef. 1763 (d.): James Brooks
 3 February 1763 – 1769 (res.): Edmund Law
 15 March 1769 – 8 May 1782 (res.): John Carver (afterwards Archdeacon of Surrey)
 23 May 1782 – 24 April 1801 (res.): William Brereton
 28 April 1801 – 23 March 1829 (d.): Robert Nares
 9 May 1829 – 13 August 1855 (d.): George Hodson
On 24 January 1837, the diocese lost the Coventry archdeaconry to the Diocese of Worcester and became the Diocese of Lichfield.
 December 1855–18 July 1876 (d.): Henry Moore

Late modern
 1876–bef. 1888: John Iles (died 1888)
Stoke archdeaconry was split off on 24 July 1877.
 1888–3 June 1898 (d.): Melville Scott
 1898–1910 (ret.): Robert Hodgson
 1911–7 June 1922 (d.): Charles Blakeway
 1922–1933 (ret.): Hugh Bright
 1935–1944 (res.): Robert Hodson
 1945–1959 (res.): William Parker
 1959–1974 (ret.): Basil Stratton (afterwards archdeacon emeritus)
 1974–1980: Richard Ninis (became Archdeacon of Lichfield)
The archdeaconry was renamed Lichfield on 25 April 1980.
 1980–1998 (ret.): Richard Ninis (previously Archdeacon of Stafford)
 1998–2000 (ret.): George Frost
 3 March 2001 – 5 May 2013 (ret.): Chris Liley
 18 July 201331 May 2019 (res.): Simon Baker
 September 2019 onwards: Sue Weller (announced)

References

Sources

 
Lists of Anglicans
Lists of English people